KMOY (92.7 FM) – branded as Cool FM 92.7 – is a commercial Adult Top 40 radio station licensed to Hagåtña, Guam. It is owned and operated by Moylan Communications Inc. It signed on the air on October 2, 2012, as the sister station to KOKU.

External links
 Cool FM Facebook website
 
 

MOY
Adult top 40 radio stations in the United States
2012 establishments in Guam
Radio stations established in 2012
Hagåtña, Guam